Akram Ahmed Salman (born 15 July 1945) is an Iraqi football manager and former head coach of Al-Wehdat.

Playing career
Akram Ahmed Salman began his career in 1963 as a player for Esalet Al-Mae, and went on to coach the team in 1970, as one of the youngest coaches in Iraq.

Coaching career
Akram Ahmed Salman coached the Iraq national team in 2015. He resigned from the position in June 2015.

Salman is now leading Erbil in the 2018-2019 season. He took lead of the team in 28 April 2019, after the leave of Nadhum Shaker. Salman is coaching the Iraqi north team now.

Managerial statistics

Honours

Manager
Tadamon Sour
Lebanese FA Cup: 2001

Erbil
Iraqi League: 2006-07

Al Wehdat
Jordan Premier League: 2008-09
Jordan FA Cup: 2008-09
Jordan FA Shield: 2010
Jordan Super Cup: 2009

Al-Tilal
Yemeni Presidents Cup: 2010

Safa
Lebanese Premier League: 2011-12, 2012-13
Lebanese FA Cup: 2012-13
Lebanese Elite Cup: 2012

Iraq
 West Asian Games: 2005

Individual
 Lebanese Premier League Best Coach: 2000–01, 2012–13

References

Iraqi football managers
Iraq national football team managers
Iraqi footballers
Sportspeople from Baghdad
1945 births
Living people
Expatriate football managers in Saudi Arabia
Al-Faisaly SC managers
Expatriate football managers in Jordan
Al-Shoulla FC managers
Al-Arabi SC (Qatar) managers
Emirates Club managers
Association footballers not categorized by position
Al-Zawraa SC managers
Al-Ramtha SC managers